The men's 100 metre freestyle event at the 2004 Summer Olympics was contested at the Olympic Aquatic Centre of the Athens Olympic Sports Complex in Athens, Greece on August 17 and 18. There were 69 competitors from 62 nations. Nations had been limited to two swimmers each since the 1984 Games.

Summary

Dutch swimmer Pieter van den Hoogenband defended his Olympic title in the event (the fourth man to do so), outside the record time of 48.17. Roland Mark Schoeman, who solidified South Africa's triumph to break a world record in the 400 m freestyle relay, took home the silver in 48.23. It was South Africa's first medal in the event. Australia's Ian Thorpe edged out Schoeman's teammate Ryk Neethling to clinch a bronze medal by 0.07 of a second, in his personal best of 48.56. Australia had not earned a medal in the men's 100 metre freestyle since 1968. Thorpe was the first man to win medals in the 100, 200, and 400 metre freestyle races in a single Olympics.

Two-time Olympic champion Alexander Popov finished only in ninth place by just two hundredths of a second (0.02) outside the top 8 field from the semifinals (49.23). By the following year, Popov announced his retirement from swimming, and became a full-time member of the International Olympic Committee. Other notable swimmers who missed the final cut featured France's Frédérick Bousquet, Lithuania's Rolandas Gimbutis, Trinidad and Tobago's George Bovell, and U.S. duo Jason Lezak and Ian Crocker. This became the first 100m freestyle where not a single American qualified for the semifinals.

Background

This was the twenty-fourth appearance of the men's 100 metre freestyle. The event has been held at every Summer Olympics except 1900 (when the shortest freestyle was the 200 metres), though the 1904 version was measured in yards rather than metres.

Two of the eight finalists from the 2000 Games returned: gold medalist Pieter van den Hoogenband of the Netherlands and silver medalist (and 1992 and 1996 gold medalist) Alexander Popov of Russia. Van den Hoogenband had placed second at the last two world championships, behind American Anthony Ervin (who had retired in 2003 at age 22) in 2001 and Popov in 2003. Ian Thorpe of Australia, primarily a middle-distance swimmer who had not competed in the 100 in 2000 when he won five gold medals, had shown ability in sprinting by placing third in the 2003 world championship.

Azerbaijan, Burundi, Guyana, Iraq, Latvia, Pakistan, Papua New Guinea, and Serbia and Montenegro each made their debut in the event. The United States made its 23rd appearance, most of any nation, having missed only the boycotted 1980 Games.

Competition format

This freestyle swimming competition consisted of three rounds: heats, semifinals, and a final. The swimmers with the best 16 times in the heats advanced to the semifinals. The swimmers with the best 8 times in the semifinals advanced to the final. Swim-offs were used as necessary to break ties for advancement to the next round.

Records

Prior to this competition, the existing world and Olympic records were as follows.

Schedule

All times are Greece Standard Time (UTC+2)

Results

Heats

Semifinals

Final

References

External links
Official Olympic Report

M
Men's events at the 2004 Summer Olympics